In telecommunications, a Signaling End Point (SEP) is an SS7 endpoint. This is to be contrasted with a Signal Transfer Point (STP).

Examples include:
Intelligent Network components such as Service Control Points (SCPs) and Service Switching Points (SSPs)
Telephone exchanges implementing Telephone User Part (TUP) or ISDN User Part (ISUP)
Mobile Switching Centers implementing MAP

References 

Signaling System 7